Mandy Brown Ojugbana is a Nigerian musician and radio presenter. In 1986, she released her debut album titled Breakthrough which included reworks of Bobby Benson's "Taxi Driver" and George Benson's "The Greatest Love of All".

Life
Ojugbana was born to an English mother and a father from Asaba, Delta State. She started her music career as a backup singer and choir member. As a teenager and choir member, the manager of a gospel record company discovered her singing style and signed her to a record contract. However, the record company was sold to a secular label who gave her a reworked version of Bobby Benson's "Taxi Driver" as one of the tracks to be included in her debut album. She released Breakthrough, her major hit in 1986 followed by an Easter concert at Eko Hotels and Suites in March 1986.

Ojugbana released another album, All My Love in 1988, and returned to her gospel roots when she sang backing vocals on Lorine Okotie's Love Medicine album. She left the music scene to study in the United Kingdom where she chose a career in broadcasting. She worked with Channel 4 TV in the UK and later came back to Nigeria to be a presenter of one of Brila FM's morning shows. She left Brila FM to be the presenter of "Smooth Breakfast with Mandy" on Smooth 98.1 FM.

References

20th-century Nigerian women singers
Nigerian broadcasters
Year of birth missing (living people)
Living people